Falsificationism may refer to:

 Critical rationalism, an epistemological philosophy founded by Karl Popper
 Three models of scientific progress in "Falsification and the Methodology of Scientific Research Programmes" by Imre Lakatos
 Dogmatic falsificationism
 Naive falsificationism
 Sophisticated falsificationism

See also 
 Falsifiability
 Falsification (disambiguation)
 Verificationism